MoRT (an acronym for "Metamorphosis of Realistic Theories"; Mort is also the French word for death) is an album by French black metal band Blut Aus Nord, released in 2006. The album showcases the band expanding upon the experimentation of their previous release The Work Which Transforms God by abandoning traditional songwriting in favour of free-form dissonance.

Album Information
Before the album was released, an alternate set of song titles was leaked, yet it did not correspond to the number of tracks that appeared on the finished album. This is perhaps a hint that this would originally have been a double album or part of a concept that is yet unfinished.

Track listing
"Chapter 1" - 6:04
"Chapter 2" - 4:44
"Chapter 3" - 5:08
"Chapter 4" - 5:41
"Chapter 5" - 6:35
"Chapter 6" - 5:02
"Chapter 7" - 6:39
"Chapter 8" - 7:20

Pre-release track listing leak
Ruins of the Genesis (Antiparticles)
Dis-Harmonization of All Visual Echoes
Fusion with the Zero
Samsaric Ocean
The Meditation of the Ghost (Samadhi)
Le Cercle de Ceux Qui Pleurent
Alienation of the Orphans

"Le Cercle de Ceux Qui Pleurent" translates as "The Circle of Those Who Cry".

Personnel
Vindsval - vocals, electric guitar
GhÖst - bass guitar
W.D. Feld - keyboards, drums, percussion

Additional Personnel
David Cragné - artwork

References

2006 albums
Blut Aus Nord albums